André and Paul Vera were French brothers who were pioneers of the Art Deco style.

André Vera (1881–1971) was a theoretician on garden design and a town planner.
Paul Vera (1882–1957) was a painter and decorator.
The Vera brothers collaborated on formal, geometric garden designs in Art Deco style.
The brothers joined with other artists to create L'Atelier Français, a cooperative business that borrowed organizational idea from the Wiener Werkstätte. The other members included Louis Süe, Roger de La Fresnaye, André Groult, Gustave Louis Jaulmes (1873–1959) and André Mare (1885–1932).

Notes

Sources

Further reading

French designers